Stephen H. Daniel (born June 9, 1950, in Salisbury, North Carolina) is an American philosopher and professor of philosophy at Texas A&M University. He is known for his expertise on George Berkeley. Daniel is the senior editor of Berkeley Studies and was the president of International Berkeley Society between 2006 and 2015.

Books
 George Berkeley and Early Modern Philosophy, New York: Oxford University Press, 2021
 Contemporary Continental Thought, Upper Saddle River, NJ: Prentice-Hall, 2005
 The Philosophy of Jonathan Edwards: A Study in Divine Semiotics. Bloomington: Indiana University Press, 1994
 Myth and Modern Philosophy. Philadelphia: Temple University Press, 1990
 John Toland: His Methods, Manners, and Mind. Montreal: McGill-Queen's University Press, 1984

See also
Nancy Kendrick

References

External links
 Personal Website
 Stephen Daniel at Texas A&M
 Teaching for Tomorrow: Dr. Steve Daniel

21st-century American philosophers
George Berkeley scholars
Continental philosophers
Philosophy academics
Living people
Texas A&M University faculty
Saint Louis University alumni
1950 births